Hooper is a city in Dodge County, Nebraska, United States. The population was 830 at the 2010 census.

History
Hooper got its start in the year 1871, following construction of the Fremont, Elkhorn and Missouri Valley Railroad through the territory. It was named for Samuel Hooper, a  US congressman from Massachusetts.

By the mid-1970s, the future of railroad service came into question.  The Chicago & North Western (C&NW) (successor to the FE&MV RR) tracks were experiencing mildly declining freight traffic levels.  In spring of 1982, flooding from the Elkhorn River & nearby Pebble Creek damaged the track.  With the declining freight traffic levels & flooding damage, the C&NW promptly filed a request with the Interstate Commerce Commission to abandon the line.  Permission was granted later that year, leaving the tracks with a dismal future.

In 1986, railroad service was revived by the newly formed Fremont & Elkhorn Valley Railroad (FEVR), which took ownership of the abandoned C&NW track.  However, a bridge north of Nickerson was deemed unsafe to cross in 2003; as a result, FEVR embargoed train service through Hooper.. In summer 2021, the tracks were dismantled as part of an effort to construct a bike path following the old railroad route.

Geography
Hooper is located at  (41.611082, -96.547238).

Demographics

2010 census
As of the census of 2010, there were 830 people, 359 households, and 228 families living in the city. The racial makeup of the city was 98.1% White, 0.1% Pacific Islander, 0.2% from other races, and 1.6% from two or more races. Hispanic or Latino of any race were 1.6% of the population.

There were 359 households, of which 28.7% had children under the age of 18 living with them, 51.0% were married couples living together, 7.8% had a female householder with no husband present, 4.7% had a male householder with no wife present, and 36.5% were non-families. 33.4% of all households were made up of individuals, and 18.7% had someone living alone who was 65 years of age or older. The average household size was 2.23 and the average family size was 2.83.

The median age in the city was 45.2 years. 22.2% of residents were under the age of 18; 4.8% were between the ages of 18 and 24; 22.8% were from 25 to 44; 25.5% were from 45 to 64; and 24.7% were 65 years of age or older. The gender makeup of the city was 49.4% male and 50.6% female.

2000 census
As of the census of 2000, there were 827 people, 350 households, and 227 families living in the city. The population density was 1,302.2 people per square mile (498.9/km2). There were 372 housing units at an average density of 585.8 per square mile (224.4/km2). The racial makeup of the city was 99.27% White, 0.12% African American, 0.24% Asian, and 0.36% from two or more races. Hispanic or Latino of any race were 0.97% of the population.

There were 350 households, out of which 27.4% had children under the age of 18 living with them, 52.9% were married couples living together, 8.3% had a female householder with no husband present, and 34.9% were non-families. 31.4% of all households were made up of individuals, and 19.7% had someone living alone who was 65 years of age or older. The average household size was 2.22 and the average family size was 2.77.

In the city, the population was spread out, with 21.9% under the age of 18, 5.8% from 18 to 24, 24.8% from 25 to 44, 21.9% from 45 to 64, and 25.6% who were 65 years of age or older. The median age was 43 years. For every 100 females, there were 80.6 males. For every 100 females age 18 and over, there were 75.5 males.

As of 2000 the median income for a household in the city was $35,515, and the median income for a family was $42,500. Males had a median income of $31,850 versus $19,943 for females. The per capita income for the city was $16,825. About 3.9% of families and 7.1% of the population were below the poverty line, including 6.1% of those under age 18 and 10.4% of those age 65 or over.

Landmarks
Hooper is noted for a  tower, with the town's name in  letters, completed in 2010 as a road sign for the town.  The tower was constructed alongside a new bypass on U.S. Route 275 that diverted the highway around the town and raised concerns that the town would be unnoticed by passing traffic.

Notable people 
 Jordan Larson, volleyball player at the University of Nebraska–Lincoln; world champion and Olympic gold medalist for the United States women's national volleyball team
 Donald K. Schwab, first lieutenant in the US Army in World War II; awarded Medal of Honor March 18, 2014 for heroism near Lure, France on September 17, 1944
  Lillian Boyer, legendary aerial daredevil, wing walker 1920s

References

External links
"Nebraska Town Refuses to Be Bypassed", slideshow in The New York Times, December 7, 2010.

Cities in Nebraska
Cities in Dodge County, Nebraska
1871 establishments in Nebraska
Populated places established in 1871